Brickellia palmeri is a Mexican species of flowering plants in the family Asteraceae. It is native to northern Mexico (Tamaulipas, Nuevo León, 	San Luis Potosí, Durango, Zacatecas).

The species is named for British botanist Edward Palmer (1829–1911).

References

External links
Photo of herbarium specimen collected in San Luis Potosí, isotype of Brickellia palmeri 
Photo of herbarium specimen collected in Nuevo León

palmeri
Flora of Mexico
Plants described in 1853